This is a list of foreign football players in Vietnam.

The List includes players from 2000 to 2023. Players of the current season are also included. All following players have played at least one game in Vietnam.
As for dual citizen, nationality is listed under official registration.

Argentina
 Mauricio Giganti
 Damián Andermatten
  Đỗ Merlo 
 Lucas Cantoro
 Matias Recio
 Gonzalo Damian Marronkle
 Nicolás Hernández
 Marcos Pirchio
 Víctor Ormazábal
 Ezequiel Brítez
 Alexis Blanco

Australia
 Robert Bajic
 Sam Gallagher
 David Vrankovic
 Nicholas Olsen

Brazil 
 Denílson
  Phan Văn Santos
 Bruno
 Josivan de Lima Fonseca
 Neto Baiano
 Antonio Carlos
 Leandro Teófilo
 Elenildo De Jesus
 Willians Bartolomeu
 Das Silva
 Juliano
 Jucelio Da Silva
 Rogerio Correira 
 Robson Damasceno de Lima
 Agostinho 
 Jose Almeida
 "King" Leandro
 Jorge Luiz
 Jesus Trindade
 Gustavo Dourado
 Leandro Cruz de Oliveira
 Jose Emidio de Almeida
 Evaldo Goncalves
  Huỳnh Kesley Alves
  Nguyễn Hoàng Helio
  Nguyễn Trung Sơn
 Nildo
 Clayton Bezerra Leite
 Rafael de Souza Oliveira
 Cristiano Roland 
 Laerte
 Ricardo Alves Fernandes
 Luciano Fonseca
 Jackson Nogueira
 Cauê Benicio
 Éder Richartz
 Rodigo Aparecido Toledo
 Ruy Netto
 Thiago Rocha
 Cleiton
 David Bala
 Ernesto Paulo
 Márcio Giovanini
 Kléber
 Gilson Campos
 Luciano Silva da Silva
 Luiz Henrique
 Thiago Junio
 Gilberto Fortunato
 Jhonatan Bernardo
 Guilherme Rodrigues Moreira
 Lucas Gaúcho
 Rafael
 Tales dos Santos
 Patrick da Silva
  Diego Silva
 Junior Paraiba
 Osmar Francisco
 Ramon
 Jardel Capistrano
 Marcelo Fernandes
 Thiago Papel
 Wander Luiz
 Eydison
Patrick Cruz
 Marcus Vinicius
 Henrique Motta
Claudecir
Pedro Paulo
 Diogo Pereira
 Gustavo Santos Costa
 Marclei Santos
 Warley Oliveira
 Alex Rafael
 Douglas Tardin
 Marcio
 Thiago Moura
 Jean Carlos
 João Paulo
 Janclesio
 Kayo Dias
 Rodrigo Dias
 Gustavo
 Bruno Cantanhede
 Geovane Magno
 Pedro Augusto
 Lucas Rocha
 Rodrigo
 Bernardo Frizoni
 Gustavo
 Felipe Martins
 Rafaelson
 Zé Paulo
 Antonio Pereira Pina Neto
 Bruno Henrique
 Diego Silva
 Alex Lima
 Caíque Lemes
 Dário Frederico da Silva
 Hendrio
 João Paulo
 Patrick
 Wesley
 Washington Brandão
 Junior Barros
 Bruno Matos
Brendon Lucas
 Guy N'Diaye
 Paulo Henrique
 Maurício
 Jefferson Baiano
 Paollo Madeira
 Alisson
 Márcio Marques
 Maurício Cordeiro
 Bruno Cosendey
 Walisson Maia
 Wellington Adão
 Dionatan Machado
 Matheus
 Lucão do Break
 Marlon Rangel
 João Guilherme Barcelos
 Maurício Pinto
 Paollo
 William Henrique
 Jhon Cley
 Jeferson Elias
 Douglas Mineiro
 Jairo Rodrigues
 Yago Ramos
 Aylton Alemão
 Conrado
 Dominic Vinicius
  Wilker
 Marcão
 Gustavo Henrique

Belgium
 Marvin Ogunjimi
 Jordy Soladio

Bosnia and Herzegovina
 Rajko Vidović
 Goran Brašnić
 Neven Lastro

Burundi
 Hussein Mbanza Nzeyimana
 Alphonse Gatera
 Dugary Ndabashinze

Burkina Faso
 Ali Rabo
 Valentin Zoungrana
 Abdoul Abass Guiro

China PR
 Zhao Shuang
 Yu Xiang
 He Zhiquiang

Cambodia
 Kao Nisai
 Ung Kanyanith

Colombia
 Edison Fonseca

Costa Rica
 Ariel Francisco Rodríguez
 José Guillermo Ortiz

Côte d'Ivoire

 Douhou Pierre
 Mohamed Koné
 Baba Ouattara
 Moussa Sanogo
 Kouassi Yao Hermann
 Oussou Konan Anicet

Cameroon
  Nguyễn Hằng Tcheuko Minh
 Emmanuel Ayuk
 Nyom Nyom Aloys
 Francois Elokan
 François Endene
 Belibi Celstin Didier
 Pascal Fofie
 Alain Ekwe
 Hervé Din Din
 Yves Mboussi
 Christian Nsi Amougou
 Gustave Bebbe
 Didier Celestin Belebi
 Edouard Ndjodo
 Marcelin Nkemi
 Paul Emile Biyaga
 Ayukokata També
 Louis Epassi Ewonde
 Aimé Djicka Gassissou
 Mark O'Ojong

Congo
 Herby Fortunat
 Rodrigue Nanitelamio
 Juvhel Tsoumou

Central African Republic
 Franklin Clovis Anzité

Croatia

 Ivica Cokolic
 Anto Pejić
 Mladen Čučić
 Rajko Vidović
 Mario Mijatović
 Goran Gruica
 Adrian Valentić
 Marko Šimić
 Josip Zeba
 Josip Balić
 Josip Ivančić
 Tonći Mujan

Canada
 Joevannie Peart

Czech Republic

 Michal Šilhavý
 Jan Žemlík
 Jan Hubka

Cuba
 Yaikel Pérez

Cape Verde
Fufuco

DR Congo

  Le Minh Tshamala
 Patiyo Tambwe

Ethiopia
 Fikru Teferra

England
 Alex Bruce

France
 David Serene
 Cédric Moukouri
 Johnny Nguyễn Ngọc Anh
 Antoine Goulard
 Loris Arnaud
 Chaher Zarour
 Youssouf Toure
 Victor Nirennold
 Philippe Nsiah
 Aboubakar Koné

Germany
 Marko Kück
 Joseph Laumann
 Dominik Schmitt

Greece
 Alexandros Tanidis

Ghana
 Felix Aboagye
 Shamo Abbey
 Mustapha Essuman
  Lê Văn Tân
 Yaw Preko
 Emanuel Bentil
 David Annas
 Michael Mensah
 William Anane
 Kwame Attram
 Daniel Obo
 Aboubakar Mahadi
 Ibrahim Abdul Razak
 Edmund Owusu-Ansah
 Bernard Achaw
  Lê Văn Phú
 Abdul Basit
 Zakaria Suraka
 Emmanuel Okutu

Guinea-Bissau
 Amido Baldé

Guam
 Brandon McDonald

Gambia
 Modou Jagne
 Alagie Sosseh
 Dawda Ceesay

Guadeloupe
 Larry Clavier

Hungary
 Károly Kovacsics
 Takacs Lajos
 Mátyás Lázár
 Gyorrgy Galhidi
 Attila Katona
 Krisztián Timár

Haiti
 Jean-Eudes Maurice
 Bicou Bissainthe

Italy

 Manuel Vergori
 Giovanni Speranza

Iran
 Iman Alami

Japan
 Ryutaro Karube
 Masaaki Ideguchi
 Daisuke Matsui
 Hiroyuki Takasaki

Jamaica
 Devon Hodges
 Errol Stevens
 Kavin Bryan
 Andre Fagan
 Sean Fraser
 Horace James
 Rimario Gordon
 Jeremie Lynch
 Chevaughn Walsh
 Atapharoy Bygrave
 Daniel Green

Kosovo
 Gramoz Kurtaj

Kyrgyzstan
 Veniamin Shumeyko

Kenya
 James Omondi
 Duncan Ochieng
 Maurice Sunguti
 Harrison Muranda
  Nguyễn Rodgers
 Allan Wanga

Liberia
 Samuel Chebli
 Buston Browne
 Alex Karmo

Lithuania
 Vytas Gašpuitis

Mali
 Souleymane Diabate
 Kalifa Dembélé

Malawi
 Victor Nyirenda

Mauritania
 Dominique Da Sylva

Macedonia
 Dragan Jakovlevski
 Filip Madžovski
 Nikolce Klečkarovski

Montenegro
 Zdravko Dragićević
 Danko Kovačević

Netherlands
 Frank van Eijs
 Robbie Servais
 Mark Rutgers
 Alexander Prent
 Koen Bosma
  Nguyễn van Bakel
 Romario Kortzorg
 Wieger Sietsma

Nigeria

  Đinh Hoàng Max
  Đặng Amaobi
  Nguyễn Quốc Thiện Esele
 Uche Iheruome
 Bassey Akpan 
 Teslim Fatusi
 Ativie Guy Ijiebor Ativie
 Emmanuel Ejike
  Nguyễn Trung Đại Dương
 Philip Okoro
 Okon Flo Essien
 Osas Idehen
 Igwe Ejke
 Olumuyiwa Aganun
 Henry Okoro
 Ifeanyi Frederick Onuigbo
 Felix Gbenga Ajala
 Aniekan Ekpe
 Emeka Oguwike
 Ebimo West
 Prince Eboagwu
 Olajide Williams
 Udo Fortune
 Jerome Ogbuefi
 Peter Omoduemuke
 Anthony Eviparker
 Sunday Chibuike
 Abdullahi Suleiman
 Haruna Abdul
 Akanni-Sunday Wasiu
 Abdulrazak Ekpoki
 Ajoku Obinna
 Dickson Nwakaeme
 Daniel Onyekachi
 Yahaya Adamu
 Samson Kpenosen
 Hammed Adesope
 Paul Nwachukwu
 Timothy Anjembe
 Joseph Nwafor
 Adebowale Ogungbure
 Clement Achilefu
 Emmanuel Izuagha
 Egware Emmanuel Eloh
 Ganiyu Oseni
 Hoàng Vũ Samson
 Sunday Emmanuel
 Odah Marshall
 Michael Olaha
 George Bisan
 Edward Ofere
 Monday Samuel
 Emmanuel Tony Agbaji
 Ismahil Akinade
 Peter Onyekachi
 Kelly Kester
 Christian Osaguona
 Samuel Nnamani

Namibia
 Sydney Plaatjies

Portugal
 Carlos Fangueiro
 Paulo Tavares
 André Vieira
 Elton Monteiro
 Muacir

Paraguay
 Anggello Machuca

Philippines
 Alfredo Razon Gonzalez
 Álvaro Silva

Palestine
 Matias Jadue

Puerto Rico
 John Krause
 Sidney Rivera

Russia
 Nikolay Tkachenko
 Rod Dyachenko

Rwanda
 Karim Kamanzi
 Jimmy Mulisa
 Julien Nsengiyumva
 Abdala Nduwimana

Romania
 Istvan Teger
 Cosmin Goia
 Robert Niță
 Petrisor Voinea

Spain
 Pablo Couñago
 Candelario Gomez
 Mario Arqués
 Carlos Hernandez

Sweden
 Darko Lukanović
 Grace Tanda

Slovakia
 Marek Matkobis
  Robert Đặng Văn

Slovenia
 Tomislav Mišura
 Nastja Ceh
 Mitja Mörec
 Ivan Firer

Scotland
 David Winters

Sierra Leone
 Umaru Rahman
 Kabba Samura
 Aluspah Brewah
 Hassan Koeman Sesay

Seychelles

 Yelvanny Rose

South Korea
 Han Young-kuk
 Hwang Jung-man
 Hwang Jung-min
 Kim Dae-chul
 Kim Gwan-hoi
 Lee Yoo-sung
 Park Sung-kwang
 Chun Dae-hwan
 Yang Hyun-jung
 Sim Woon-sub
 Han Seung-yeop
 Kim Bong-jin
 Kim Jin-seo
 Ahn Byung-keon
 Seo Yong-duk
 Woo Sang-ho
 Kim Dong-su
 An Sae-hee

South Africa
 Philani

Senegal
 Mohamed Moustapha N'diaye
 Pape Omar Faye
 Abass Cheikh Dieng
 Diao Sadio
 Papé Diakité
 Abdoulaye Diallo

Serbia
 Dalibor Mitrović
 Nenad Stojaković
 Milorad Janjuš
 Bojan Mamić
 Slobodan Dinčić
 Anto Pejić
 Damir Memović
 Igor Jelić
 Đuro Zec

Togo
 Vincent Bossou

Tanzania

 Abdi Kassim
 Danny Mrwanda

Tajikistan 

 Umed Khabibulloyev

Trinidad and Tobago 
 Hughtun Hector
 Willis Plaza
 Daneil Cyrus
 Shackeil Henry
 Neil Benjamin

Thailand 

 Tawan Sripan
 Kiatisuk Senamuang
 Datsakorn Thonglao
 Worrawoot Srimaka
 Therdsak Chaiman
 Choketawee Promrut 
 Kittisak Rawangpa
 Dusit Chalermsan
 Sakda Joemdee
 Pipat Thonkanya
 Yuttajak Kornchan
 Vimol Jankam
 Ekkaluck Thonghkit
 Chukiat Noosarung
 Niweat Siriwong
 Pattara Piyapatrakitti
 Pitipong Kuldilok
 Narongchai Vachiraban
 Manit Noywech
 Issawa Singthong
 Nirut Surasiang
 Sarayoot Chaikamdee

Uganda
 Jamil Kyambadde
 Iddi Batambuje
 Charles Livingstone Mbabazi
 Ibrahim Juma
 Moses Oloya
 Kasule Owen
 Brian Umony
 Joseph Ochaya
 Henry Kisekka
 Hassan Wasswa
 Francis Onyango
 Sam Kawalya
 Andrew Mwesigwa
 Andrew Lutaya Lule
  Trần Trung Hiếu
 Joseph Mpande

Ukraine

  Đinh Hoàng La
 Dmytro Pronevych

Uzbekistan
 Jahongir Abdumominov

United States

 Lee Nguyen
 Chris Williams
 Justin Myers
 Mobi Fehr
 Ashkanov Apollon
 Victor Mansaray
 Jonny Campbell

Zimbabwe

 Tostao Kwashi
 Justice Majabvi
 Victor Kamhuka

Zambia
 Signs Chibambo

References

V. League 1
Association football player non-biographical articles